Anna Jessica Leat (born 26 June 2001) is a New Zealand footballer who plays as a goalkeeper for Aston Villa in the Women's Super League and New Zealand women's national football team

Personal life
Leat was born in Arrowtown. She attended Rangitoto College in Auckland and was named the school's Sportswomen of the Year in 2017 and 2018.

College career
In February 2019, Leat started studying at Georgetown University and joined the Georgetown Hoyas as a freshman. she would play 18 games, starting in 16 and only allowing 19 goals, helping the Hoyas to 10 wins. She returned to New Zealand after the coronavirus pandemic began.

Club career
Leat played for both East Coast Bays and Glenfield Rovers while at high school. While playing for East Coast Bays, she became the first female to be named in a Chatham Cup squad in the 2021 edition.

On 7 August 2021 it was announced that Leat had signed with West Ham United who play in the FA Women's Super League. On 11 May 2022, West Ham United confirmed that Leat was not offered a new contract and would depart at the end of the season.

On 13 July 2022 Aston Villa announced the signing of Leat for the 2022–23 season. Leat made her Villa debut on 1 October 2022, in a FA Women's League Cup game against Manchester United. After the match ended in a 1–1 draw, Aston Villa won on penalties thanks to four saves by Leat.

International career
Leat made her senior starting début at 16 years old, in a 5–0 win over Thailand on 28 November 2017.

On 25 November 2018, Leat was part of the New Zealand U17 side who became the first New Zealand team in either women's or men's football to qualify for a semi-final at a World Cup. Leat helped the team win its quarter-final against Japan at the U-17 Women's World Cup in Uruguay by saving two penalties and scoring the winning goal. Her final penalty goal won the public vote as the favourite sporting moment at the 2018 Halberg Awards. The team would then lose 0–2 to Spain in the semi-final but win New Zealand's first ever medal at a World Cup by beating Canada in the third place match.

Leat has also played at the 2016 FIFA U-17 Women's World Cup in Jordan, the 2018 FIFA U-20 Women's World Cup in France, the 2019 FFA Cup of Nations, the 2020 Algarve Cup. and the 2020 Olympics in Tokyo.

Career statistics

Club

International

Honours
National team U-17
3rd place U-17 World Cup: 2018

Individual
Halberg Awards: 2018 Favourite Sporting Moment

References

External links

2001 births
Living people
New Zealand women's association footballers
New Zealand women's international footballers
Expatriate women's footballers in England
Women's association football goalkeepers
Footballers at the 2020 Summer Olympics
Olympic association footballers of New Zealand
People educated at Rangitoto College
New Zealand expatriate sportspeople in England
Aston Villa W.F.C. players
New Zealand expatriate women's association footballers
Georgetown Hoyas women's soccer players
New Zealand expatriate sportspeople in the United States
Expatriate women's soccer players in the United States
Sportspeople from Otago
West Ham United F.C. Women players
People from Arrowtown
East Coast Bays AFC players